Ri Chang-ho (born 4 January 1990) is a North Korean professional footballer who plays as a defender.

Honours 
Rimyongsu
 AFC President's Cup runner-up: 2014

References

External links 
 
Ri Chang-ho at DPRKFootball

1990 births
Living people
North Korean footballers
North Korea international footballers
Association football defenders
2015 AFC Asian Cup players
2019 AFC Asian Cup players